Government Rajindra College in Bathinda, Punjab, India, is affiliated to the Punjabi University. This is a renowned institution of the Malwa region of State of Punjab. Government Rajindra College is accredited with B+ Grade by NAAC in February 2004 with an overall score of 77%.

History
Government Rajindra College is one of the oldest institutions in the Malwa region, established in 1940. It was founded in memory of Maharaja Rajinder Singh. This college was established as a primary school in the year 1904 and turned into an Intermediate College in 1940. The undergraduate courses in humanities stream were started in the year of 1950. Studies in the field of Science were started in 1955, B.Sc classes in the year of 1962 and the Commerce stream was introduced in the year of 1968. The institution is currently being headed by Dr. Jyoti Parkash.

Departments
The college currently has the following departments.
Botany
Chemistry
Commerce
Computer science
Economics
English
Geography
Hindi
History
Mathematics
Music
Philosophy
Physical Education
Physics
Political science
Psychology
Punjabi
Sanskrit
Zoology

Infrastructure
The college has a very spacious auditorium, big play ground and an open-air theatre named 'Balwant Gargi theatre'. The library stocks more than 49,232 books (according to 2015) and subscribes to several journals. The latest books are added regularly. The library has a reading hall. To further modernize college library services, it is being computerized. Students are encouraged to take active part in sports. Facilities for games such as hockey, football, cricket, basketball, volleyball, athletics, etc. and well as indoor games are provided.

Notable Alumnus
Balwinder Singh Bhunder (M.P. Rajya Sabha)

Courses

Reference

References

External links
 Official Website

Universities and colleges in Punjab, India
Education in Bathinda
1940 establishments in India